HMS Northumberland is a Type 23 frigate of the Royal Navy.  She is named after the Duke of Northumberland.  She is the eighth RN ship to bear the name since the first 70-gun ship of the line in 1679, and the ninth in the class of Type 23 frigates. She is based at Devonport and is part of the Devonport Flotilla.

Service history

Construction
Northumberland is one of four Type 23 frigates built by Swan Hunter on the Tyne at Wallsend.  She was launched by her sponsor Lady Kerr, wife of Admiral Sir John Kerr, the former Commander-in-Chief Naval Home Command, in April 1992 and was accepted into Royal Naval Service in May 1994.

1994–2000
After sea trials and going through F.O.S.T. Northumberland was deployed to the Falklands. During her passage, Northumberland had to divert into rough weather to effect the rescue of a fishing trawler; during the diversion the ship allegedly struck a whale; although the damage was actually caused by the vessel "slamming" in high seas at speed whilst proceeding to the rescue. At Tenerife, after dropping off the rescued fishermen, the bow dome began to leak; this continued during her resumed voyage to the Falkland Islands. Northumberland took up station at South Georgia undertaking fishery protection duties; when this was complete a dry dock was found in Rio de Janeiro that was suitable to carry out a bow dome change. Once better weather arrived she sailed to Brazil to be put into dry dock. She was escorted in by two ex-Royal Navy Type 22 frigates. Once in the dry dock, repairs took three weeks at a cost of £3 million.

Deploying to the Caribbean in 1999 for counter narcotics and disaster relief duties, Northumberland seized over two tonnes of cocaine (with a street-value of £135 million), in cooperation with a United States Coast Guard law enforcement detachment.

2001–2010
From July 2004 to July 2005, Northumberland underwent an extensive refit at Number 1 Dock (Inner) at Babcock's dockyard in Rosyth, her first refit since build.  This refit saw her equipped with an updated suite of weapons and sensors (e.g. a modified 4.5" Gun and the latest Low Frequency Active Sonar) and of propulsion and mechanical systems.  Improvements were also made to the living quarters and a state of the art galley to feed the Ship's Company.  Also replaced were corroded areas of the flight deck, improvements were made to the lighting system used during night landings and a new helicopter handling system to move a 13-ton Merlin helicopter safely in and out of the hangar installed.  (Although the Type 23 was originally designed to operate the Merlin, Northumberland had previously only hosted the much smaller Lynx.) The combination of 2087 LFAS and Merlin ASW helicopter has subsequently proved highly effective and the class is widely regarded as the most capable anti-submarine frigate afloat.

Northumberland rejoined the fleet at the Trafalgar 200 celebrations, then embarked for a period of sea training, starting with BOST (Basic Operational Sea Training) in January 2006, straight after the Christmas leave period. For a time during 2006 Northumberland accompanied the submarine  on her deployment to the US AUTEC (Acoustic Undersea Testing and Evaluation Centre) which is based on Andros Island in the Bahamas. In 2007 she deployed to the Mediterranean as part of the UK's contribution to NATO maritime forces.

In 2008, Northumberland deployed to the Indian Ocean as the first RN warship to participate in the EU's counter piracy Operation Atalanta, conducting numerous counter-piracy patrols in the Gulf of Aden and escorting World Food Programme humanitarian shipping between Mombasa and Mogadishu; this was partially documented in the Sky TV programme Ross Kemp in Search of Pirates.

She deployed to the Indian Ocean again in 2010 for an eight-month counter-piracy patrol as part of the international naval counter-piracy task force, TF 151 and conducted numerous operations to disrupt piracy activity in the Gulf of Aden and the eastern Somali coast.

Northumberland returned to the UK at the end of 2010 to prepare to enter refit in 2011.

2011–2020
As part of an extensive refit at the beginning of 2011, Northumberland received several significant technology upgrades.  The Sea Wolf point defence missile system was upgraded with the Sea Wolf Mid-Life Update (SWMLU – pronounced "swimloo") which substantially improved the range, performance and reliability of the system. The combat system was upgraded from outfit DNA to DNA2, replacing the combat system architecture to improve redundancy and system performance, and a software upgrade which significantly improves overall functionality and sensor integration, as well as providing MMI convergence with the Type 45 destroyer's command system.  The two 30mm BMARC cannons were replaced by two 30mm Automated Small Calibre Gun (ASCG) mountings. These allow remote control of the mount via operator consoles and integrated Electro Optic fire control. Additional modifications improved habitability and reliability in high ambient temperatures.

Emerging from refit in the summer of 2011, Northumberland completed her sea trials and weapon acceptance programme, conducting eight weeks of Basic Operational Sea Training (BOST) in early 2012.  She deployed back to the Indian Ocean in the Autumn of 2012 for counter-piracy and counter-narcotics tasking.  This included the successful capture and destruction of over £5M of cannabis resin from a smuggler in the Arabian Sea. She returned to the UK in May 2013.

Northumberland participated in Exercise Joint Warrior 2013.

The ship joined the COUGAR 14 Response Force Task Group deployment for exercises in the Mediterranean and Gulf regions.

Northumberland eventually returned to Devonport on 5 December 2014 after a deployment which included visits to Gibraltar, Souda Bay in Crete, Bahrain, Dubai and Fujairah in the United Arab Emirates, Mumbai in India, Muscat in Oman, Malta and Lisbon.

On 9 May 2015, Northumberland was present in St Peter Port for the commemorations marking the 70th anniversary of Guernsey's Liberation. Celebrations began with a reception and capability demonstration onboard hosted by the Second Sea Lord. Guests included the Duke of Edinburgh, as Admiral of the Royal Yacht Squadron, and foreign royals including King Harald of Norway, Juan Carlos, the former king of Spain and Prince Henrik of Denmark.

In 2016, during preparations for entering refit in Devonport, Northumberland hosted the semi-final stage of the BBC series Masterchef. As part of her re-fit, she was upgraded with Sea Ceptor surface-to-air missiles and returned to sea in 2018

In late 2020, with a television crew filming on board, a Russian submarine being tracked in the North Atlantic hit Northumberland'''s towed sonar, requiring the frigate to abort the 48-hour mission to find the submarine and return to port to replace the sonar. The Ministry of Defence does not normally comment on such incidents, but this one was caught on camera.

In December 2020, during the COVID-19 pandemic, Northumberland returned to Devonport after a number of suspected COVID-19 cases had been discovered on board. The ship was previously tasked with patrolling UK waters over the festive period but returned to Devonport so that the crew could isolate, in accordance with health guidelines. The Royal Navy stated that the ship would still continue to meet its operational tasks over Christmas.

Since 2021

In June 2021, Northumberland, along with Tamar and Tyne, was deployed off the Cornish coast to provide security for the 2021 G7 summit.

Affiliations

She is affiliated to numerous organisations:
 Northumberland County Council
  and the Northumbrian Universities Royal Naval Unit
 The Light Dragoons
 The Royal Regiment of Fusiliers
 The 5th Battalion, the Royal Regiment of Fusiliers
 The Sir James Knott Trust
 The Worshipful Company of Bowyers
 The Worshipful Company of Carmen of the City of London (1517)
 The Bank of England's North Eastern Regional Agency
 The Calvert Trust
 Hexham Abbey
 RAF Boulmer
 The Copthorne Hotel, Newcastle upon Tyne
 Spirit of North-cumberland, the RNLI Tynemouth Lifeboat
 TS Tenacity SCC
 The Morpeth Pipe Band (whose pipers regularly pipe the Ship in and out of Devonport when deploying or returning)
 TS Dreadnought'' (Greenwich, Deptford & Rotherhithe Sea Cadets)
 Dame Alice Harpur School, Bedford High School and Bedford School
 Solihull School CCF

On that visit she was open to the public with a display on modern anti-slaving operations in which she and other ships of the Royal Navy take part. She also visited Baltimore in June 2006, Marmaris in Turkey in February 2003 and in October 2001 attended an Australian Fleet Review in Sydney.

References

External links 

 

 

Frigates of the United Kingdom
Military history of Northumberland
Ships built by Swan Hunter
Ships built on the River Tyne
1992 ships
Type 23 frigates of the Royal Navy
Maritime incidents in 2020